William Berridge may refer to:

William Berridge (cricketer, born 1892) (1892–1968), English cricketer
William Berridge (cricketer, born 1894) (1894–1973), English cricketer